Lemoore Union High School District is a public school district based in Kings County, California, United States.

External links
 

School districts in Kings County, California
Lemoore, California